Stephen Arthur Jensen (born May 30, 1954) is a Canadian prelate of the Roman Catholic Church. He was ordained a priest on May 24, 1980 by then-Archbishop James Francis Carney. On April 2, 2013, he was ordained Bishop of the Diocese of Prince George.

Background 

Jensen was born on May 30, 1954 in North Vancouver. He studied at St. Peter's Seminary in London, Ontario, receiving a BA in Philosophy and a Master of Divinity in 1976 and 1979 respectively.

Ordination 

Jensen was ordained as a priest on May 24, 1980, by the then-Archbishop of Vancouver James Carney. He then served as pastor for Immaculate Conception in Vancouver, St. Ann's in Abbotsford, and Corpus Christi, also in Vancouver.

Diocese of Prince George 

On April 2, 2013, Jensen was ordained the Bishop of the Diocese of Prince George by Archbishop J. Michael Miller. Jensen has served in his post since that date, and remains a member of the board for St. Mark's College and Corpus Christi College.

See also 
Catholic Church in Canada

References 

1954 births
Living people
People from North Vancouver
21st-century Roman Catholic bishops in Canada
Roman Catholic bishops of Prince George